Eve of Destruction may refer to:

Film and television
 Eve of Destruction (film), a 1991 American science fiction film
 Eve of Destruction (miniseries), a 2013 American-Canadian television miniseries
 "Eve of Destruction" (Grimm), a television episode
 "Eve of Destruction" (Just Shoot Me!), a television episode

Music
 Eve (rapper) (born 1978), or Eve of Destruction, American rapper
 Eve of Destruction (Barry McGuire album), 1965
 "Eve of Destruction" (song), the title song
 Eve of Destruction, an album by Johnny Thunders, 2005
 "Eve of Destruction", a song by the Chemical Brothers from No Geography, 2019

Sports
 Eves of Destruction, a women's roller derby league in Victoria, British Columbia, Canada
 Eve of Destruction, an annual car destruction event at La Crosse Fairgrounds Speedway, West Salem, Wisconsin, US
 Eve of Destruction, an annual car destruction event at Wisconsin International Raceway, Kaukauna, Wisconsin, US

Video games
 Test Drive: Eve of Destruction, a 2004 racing video game
 Nemesis 3: The Eve of Destruction, a 1988 video game in the Gradius sidescolling shooter series
 Eve of Destruction, a series of mods for the first-person shooter Battlefield 1942
 "Eve of Destruction", the final level of the video game The Kore Gang

Other uses
 X-Men: Eve of Destruction, a 2001 crossover storyline in Marvel Comics' X-Men series
 Eve of Destruction, a 2009 Marked Series novel by S. J. Day
 "Eve of Destruction", a US Army Vietnam War-era gun truck

See also

 On the Eve of Destruction: 1991–1995, a 2005 album by the Suicide Machines